Kiribati competed at the 2019 Pacific Games in Apia, Samoa from 7 to 20 July 2019. The country participated in twelve sports at the 2019 games.

Athletics

Badminton

Kiribati qualified two men and two women in badminton for the 2019 games.

Men
 Timwata Kabaua
 Tooma Teuaika

Women
 Tinabora Tekeiaki
 Teitiria Utimawa

Basketball

5x5

Men's basketball
 TBC

Women's basketball
 TBC

3x3

Men
 TBC

Women
 TBC

Boxing

Judo

Powerlifting

Swimming

Taekwondo

Tennis

Volleyball

Beach volleyball

Volleyball (Indoor)

Weightlifting

References

Nations at the 2019 Pacific Games
2019